is a Japanese actor, voice actor, and singer.

He has had voice roles in anime such as Legend of the Galactic Heroes, Space Battleship Yamato, and Gatchaman. He has also performed the opening themes for anime such as Yamato, Star of the Giants, Getter Robo, Casshern, Grendizer, Gaiking and tokusatsu series such as Himitsu Sentai Gorenger, J.A.K.Q. Dengekitai, Choujinki Metalder, and most recently Tokusou Sentai Dekaranger. He has also had an acting role in the tokusatsu film Kamen Rider ZO, OOO, Den-O, All Riders: Let's Go Kamen Riders and in the series Kyojuu Tokusou Juspion. He is also known for dubbing over Sylvester Stallone, and Christopher Reeve.

As an actor, Sasaki was Selected for the lead role in Nagisa Ōshima's film The Sun's Burial in 1960 by Ōshima. Sasaki played the leading roles in seven films when he was an actor under contract with Shochiku studio. In 1969, he landed lead role on the TV jidaigeki Yōjutsu Bugeichō.

Filmography

Film
The Sun's Burial (1960) – Takeshi
Mesu (1964) – Yoshida
Pale Flower (1964) – Jirō
Kuroineko (1965) – Shigeru Kizawa
Kyōyou no Hanamichi Dos (1966) – Kanta
Daikanbu Nagurikomi (1969) – Giro
Zankoku Onnashikei (1969) – Okamoto
Mujo (1970) – Yasuhiro Mori
Taro! (1991) – Takamatsu
Kamen Rider ZO (1993) – Dr. Mochizuki
Tokusou Sentai Dekaranger The Movie: Full Blast Action (2004) – Michael Micson (voice)
Space Battleship Yamato (2010) – Narrator
OOO, Den-O, All Riders: Let's Go Kamen Riders (2011) – Shocker Scientist (Naoki)
Kaizoku Sentai Gokaiger the Movie: The Flying Ghost Ship (2011) – Gatsun (voice)
Saber + Zenkaiger: Super Hero Senki (2021) – Sentai Megid (voice)

Live action television series
Yōjutsu Bugeichō (1969) – Kidō Makotonosuke (Lead role)
Haru no Sakamichi (1971) – Matsudaira Tadanao
Kamen Rider Ep.81 (1972) – Shintaro Mine
Horror Theater Unbalance Ep.13 (1973) – Tatsuya Mori
Hissatsu Shiokinin (1973) – Ep.6
G-Men '75 (1975–81) Ep.145, 146, 147 and 148
Hissatsu Karakurinin (1986) Ep.4
Daitokai Part2 (1977–78) Ep.21, 41 and 52
Seito Shokun! (1980) – Seiji Kitashiro
Taiyō ni Hoero! (1983) Ep.544
Kyojuu Tokusou Juspion (1985) – Ken'ichirou Nanbara
Furuhata Ninzaburō Series 3 Ep.37, 38 (1999) – Mutouda
Aoi Tokugawa Sandai (2000) – Hosokawa Tadaoki
Shinsengumi! (2004) – Uchiyama Hikojirō
Dondo Hare (2008) – Masato Yoshizawa
Tenchijin (2009) – Daidōji Masashige

Television animation
Science Ninja Team Gatchaman (1972) – George Asakura/Joe the Condor
Space Battleship Yamato II (1978) – Hajime Saito
Gatchaman II (1978) – George Asakura/Joe the Condor
Gatchaman Fighter (1979) – George Asakura/Joe the Condor
Les Aventures de Colargol (1979) – Crow
The Mysterious Cities of Gold (1982) – Mendosa
Ai Shite Knight (1983) – Go Kato
Jungle Emperor 3rd Series (1989) – Panja
The Galaxy Railways (2003) – Fahren Fort Drake
Romance of the Three Kingdoms (2010) – Lü Bu
She Professed Herself Pupil of the Wise Man (2022) – Mira/Dunbalf Gandagore/Sakimori Kagami (Male)

OVA
Legend of the Galactic Heroes (1998) – Erich Von Haltenberg
Great Yamato No. Zero (2004) – Sōji Ozuma
Space Battleship Yamato 2202 (2018) – Shuntaro Yasuda

Theatrical animation
Uchu Enban Daisenso (1975) – Duke Fleed
Farewell to Space Battleship Yamato (1978) – Hajime Saito
Final Yamato (1983) – Daisuke Shima

Video Games
Tatsunoko Fight (2000) – Joe the Condor,Announcement voice
Hanjuku Hero Tai 3D (2003) – Eggman
Hanjuku Hero 4 (2005) – Eggman,Isao Sasaki
Tatsunoko vs. Capcom: Ultimate All-Stars (2008) – Joe the Condor

Dubbing Roles

Live-action
Sylvester Stallone
Escape to Victory (1982 Fuji Television edition) (Captain Robert Hatch)
Nighthawks (1987 TV Asahi edition) (Detective Sergeant Deke DaSilv)
First Blood (1995 TV Asahi edition) (John Rambo)
Rambo: First Blood Part II (1995 TV Asahi edition) (John Rambo)
Rocky IV (1995 TV Asahi edition) (Rocky Balboa)
Cobra (1994 TV Asahi edition) (Lieutenant Marion 'Cobra' Cobretti)
Rambo III (1994 TV Asahi edition) (John Rambo)
Tango & Cash (1993 TV Asahi edition) (Lt. Ray Tango)
Rocky V (1991 VHS edition) (Rocky Balboa)
Cliffhanger (2014 BS Japan edition) (Gabriel "Gabe" Walker)
Demolition Man (1997 TV Asahi edition) (Detective Sergeant John Spartan)
The Specialist (1998 TV Asahi edition) (Ray Quic)
Assassins (2000 TV Asahi edition) (Robert Rath)
Daylight (2000 TV Asahi edition) (Kit Latura)
Get Carter (2005 TV Tokyo edition) (Jack Carter)
Driven (2007 TV Tokyo edition) (Joe Tanto)
D-Tox (2006 TV Tokyo edition) (FBI agent Jake Malloy)
Shade (The Dean)
Taxi 3 (2005 Fuji TV edition) (Passenger to Airport)
Rambo (John Rambo)
The Expendables (Barney Ross)
The Expendables 2 (Barney Ross)
Bullet to the Head (James "Jimmy Bobo" Bonomo)
Escape Plan (Ray Breslin)
Grudge Match (Henry "Razor" Sharp)
The Expendables 3 (Barney Ross)
Guardians of the Galaxy Vol. 2 (Stakar Ogord)
Escape Plan 2: Hades (Ray Breslin)
Escape Plan: The Extractors (Ray Breslin)
Rambo: Last Blood (John J. Rambo)
Christopher Reeve
Superman (1983 TV Asahi edition) (Superman)
Superman II (1984 TV Asahi and 1990 TBS editions) (Superman)
Somewhere in Time (2021 BS TV Tokyo edition) (Richard Collier)
Superman III (1985 TV Asahi edition) (Superman)
Faerie Tale Theatre Season 2 Ep.3 Sleeping Beauty (1985 VHS edition) (Prince Charming)
Superman IV: The Quest for Peace (1989 TV Tokyo edition) (Superman)
The Great Escape II: The Untold Story (1990 TV Asahi edition) (Maj. John Dodge)
Village of the Damned (1998 TV Asahi edition) (Dr. Alan Chaffee)
David Hasselhoff
Knight Rider (Michael Knight)
Knight Rider (2008) -Knight Rider NEXT- (Michael Knight (1st Generation))
Hop (David Hasselhoff)
Guardians of the Galaxy Vol. 2 (David Hasselhoff)
Elvis Presley
Flaming Star (1968 TV Asahi and 1973 Fuji Television edition) (Pacer Burton)
Blue Hawaii (1977 TV Asahi and 1981 LD edition) (Chad (Chadwick) Gates)
Dick Van Dyke
Mary Poppins (1986 Fuji Television edition) (Bert)
Chitty Chitty Bang Bang (1989 VHS edition) (Caractacus Pott)
Earl Holliman
Gunfight at the O.K. Corral (1975 TV Tokyo edition) (Deputy Sheriff Charlie Bassett)
The Sons of Katie Elder (1971 Fuji Television edition) (Matt Elder)
On the Town (1991 Nippon TV edition) (Ozzie (Jules Munshin))
Shane (1990 TV Tokyo edition) (Shane (Alan Ladd))
The Young Lions (1976 Fuji Television edition) (Noah Ackerman (Montgomery Clift))
Ben-Hur (1979 Nippon TV edition) (Messala (Stephen Boyd))
True Grit (1985 TV Asahi edition) (La Boeuf (Glen Campbell))
Airport (1994 Nippon TV edition) (Vernon Demerest (Dean Martin))
The Persuaders! (1974 - 75 TV Asahi edition) (Lord Brett Sinclair (Roger Moore))
American Graffiti (1980 Fuji Television edition) (John Milner (Paul Le Mat))
Thunderbolt and Lightfoot (1978 TBS edition) (Lightfoot (Jeff Bridges))
The Golden Voyage of Sinbad (1992 TV Asahi edition) (Sinbad (John Phillip Law))
Two-Minute Warning (1994 TV Asahi edition) (Capt. Peter Holly (Charlton Heston))
Wonder Woman Season 2, Season 3 (1980 - 81 Fuji Television edition) (Steve Trevor Jr. (Lyle Waggoner))
Battlestar Galactica (1979 - 81 Nippon TV edition) (Captain Apollo (Richard Hatch))
Platoon (1989 TV Asahi edition) (Bob Barnes (Tom Berenger))
F/X (1989 TV Asahi edition) (Roland "Rollie" Tyler (Bryan Brown))
F/X2 (1992 VHS edition) (Roland "Rollie" Tyler (Bryan Brown))
I Love You to Death (1991 VHS edition) (Joey Boca (Kevin Kline))

Animation
Balto (Steele)

Music
 (1960)

Casshan (1973)

 (along with Columbia Cradle Club)

Getter Robo (1974)

Hurricane Polymar (1974)

Space Battleship Yamato (1974)

Himitsu Sentai Gorenger (1975)

 (along with Mitsuko Horie)

 (along with Mitsuko Horie)

Getter Robo G (1975)

Uchu Enban Daisenso (1975)

Grendizer (1975)

Gaiking (1976)

Grendizer, Getter Robo G, Great Mazinger: Kessen! Daikaijuu (1976)

J.A.K.Q. Dengekitai (1977)

Mazinger Z (English Version, 1977)

Starzinger (1978)

Message from Space: Galactic Wars (1978)

Galaxy Express 999 (1978)

Tōshō Daimos (1978)

Science Ninja Team Gatchaman II (1978)

The 6 Ultra Brothers vs. the Monster Army (1979)
 

The Ultraman (1979)
 
 

Gatchaman Fighter (1979)

Kamen Rider The Movie Eight Riders vs. Gingaoh (1980)

G-Men '75 (1979–80)
 

Space Emperor God Sigma (1980)

Choujinki Metalder (1987)

Gekigangar 3 (OVA, 1998)

Ultraseven 1999 The Final Chapters (1999)
 
 

Ultraseven 35th Anniversary EVOLUTION (2002)
 
 The Galaxy Railways (2003) 
 Tokusou Sentai Dekaranger (2004)Romance of the Three Kingdoms (Japanese Version, 2010) Space Battleship Yamato 2199 (2013)Tokusou Sentai Dekaranger 10 YEARS AFTER (2015)Space Battleship Yamato 2202 (2017)Kikai Sentai Zenkaiger (2021)'''

References

External links
Official website 
Isao Sasaki at Yahoo! Directories 
Sasaki, Isao Discography
Isao Sasaki Videos

1942 births
Living people
Anime musicians
Japanese male film actors
Japanese male video game actors
Male voice actors from Tokyo
Singers from Tokyo
20th-century Japanese male actors
21st-century Japanese male actors
20th-century Japanese male singers
20th-century Japanese singers
21st-century Japanese male singers
21st-century Japanese singers